Ryszard Lubicki (3 September 1936 – 28 January 2003) was a Polish rower. He competed in the men's coxed four event at the 1964 Summer Olympics.

References

1936 births
2003 deaths
People from Luninets District
Polish male rowers
Olympic rowers of Poland
Rowers at the 1964 Summer Olympics